Haragapur is a village in Belgaum district in the southern state of Karnataka, India.
It is attached to NH-4. Places to visit are Shivaji Fort, Mallikarjun Temple & Navanath Mandir. Village is located on Hilltop. 
Language spoken here is Kannada

References

Festival : Some of the festivals

1). Makara Shankranti: Makara Shankranti is the harvest festival, a new year and the festival of rejoicing and celebrations embracing the entire household friends and neighbors, the servants and the poor, the cows, and then all other living creatures symbolizes universal love and kindness.

2). Maha Shivaratri: Maha Shivratri is a Hindu festival celebrated every year in reverence of Lord Shiva. It is also known as padmarajarathri.

3). Ugadi: This festival falls on the first day of Chaitra, according to the Lunar calendar; this festival even marks the Chandramana New Year in the month of March–April in Karnataka.

4). Nagarpanchami: Nag Panchami is a festival during which Hindus in some parts of India worship live Nāgas (cobras) or images of them. It is celebrated on the fifth day after Amavasya of the month of Shraavana. Traditionally, married young women visit their premarital households to celebrate the festival. Especially in villages, an aspect of the celebration involves women swinging on swings hung on tree branches.

5). Dussera: Dussehra festival is celebrated in an extravagant manner in Karnataka or to be more precise in Mysore. Locally the festival celebration is called Nadahabba.

6). Deepavali: Deepavali or Diwali is the festival of diyas or deepas (lights). This five-day festival marks the Demon Narkasura killed by Lord Krishna, has been celebrated across the country and all over the world by Hindus. It is also called Kaumudi Deepam or Dipalika. The Festival Of Lights is the most celebrated Hindu festival.

7). Ganesha Chaturthi: Ganesha Chaturthi or Ganesha Festival is a day on which Lord Ganesha, the son of Shiva and Parvati, resurrected to life on earth with the head of elephant. It is celebrated as it is the birthday of Lord Ganesha..

8). Gowri Habba: Gowri Habba or festival is celebrated a day before Ganesh Chaturthi. Goddess Gowri, wife of Lord Shiva, the mother of Lord Ganesha and Lord Subramanya is worshiped throughout India for her ability to bestow upon her devotees power, courage.

9). Vaikunta Ekadashi: Vaikunta Ekadashi, occurs in the Hindu calendar month of Marghazhi or Margashira or Margasirsa (corresponding to late December – January in English calendar). Vaishnavism (Worship of Lord Vishnu) culture believes that ‘Vaikunta Dwaram’ or ‘the gate to Lord’s Inner Sanctum’ is opened on this day. The Margashirsha shukla paksha ekadashi in lunar calendar is known

10). Kar Hunnive: This is observed on the Full moon day of Jyestha (June) by worshipping the bullocks and the agricultural implements. A special feast is prepared in the afternoon. In the evening a function called Karihariyodu is performed, in which the main event is a bullock race. Many pairs of bullocks participate in the running race and the pair which comes first is acclaimed by the public. If the bullocks, which come first, are red or brown in colour, it is assumed that the red variety of jowar (sorghum) will grow in abundance during the ensuing season. However, if the winning pair is white in colour, then it is assumed that white jowar will grow in plenty the following season.

11). Shravan Mondays: Every Monday in the month of Shravan is considered as a festival day in the village. People offer special worship at the temple of Shidlingappa. They carry the deity in a palanquin in a procession accompanied by music on all the Mondays in Shravana and offer special worship. Many of them observe partial fasting on these days. On the last Shravana Monday they arrange special festivities. They arrange bhajans near the Patrappa tree and feed about 100 people next day.

12). Shigi Hunnive: It is one of the important festivals in the village and a local fair in honour of god Vithappa, is also related with it.

13). Navaratri: Navaratri is one of the most colorful, dutiful and longest festival observed by Hindus in India. A nine-day festival Navaratri (Nava means nine, Ratri means night) is also called as Dasara/Dushhera which usually falls some time between last week of September and first week of October.

14). Vara Mahalakshmi: Mahalakshmi is the goddess of wealth, auspiciousness and prosperity. She is worshiped for healthy progeny, as well as the health and long life of the husband. Vratha is observed on a Friday that falls before the full Moon day of the month of Shravanamasa (August – September).

Written by : Vasanth Paul, Posting id :140356

Villages in Belagavi district